Florida is a station on Line B of the Buenos Aires Underground. The station was opened in December 1931 as part of the extension of the line from Carlos Pellegrini to Leandro N. Alem.

It is located in the San Nicolás barrio, at the intersection of Avenida Corrientes and Calle Florida, and named after the latter.

References

External links

Buenos Aires Underground stations
1931 establishments in Argentina
Railway stations opened in 1931